Sutai (Sutai khairkhan uul) is a mountain between Govi-Altai Province and Khovd Province in western Mongolia.

See also
 List of mountains in Mongolia
 List of Ultras of Central Asia

References

Altai Mountains
Mountains of Mongolia